John Randolph Hearst (1909–1958) was an American business executive and the third son of William Randolph Hearst.

Career 
Hearst, like his brothers, worked for the Hearst Corporation and was said to have the most executive talent among the sons of William Randolph Hearst. Any question of his rivaling the non-family executives who constituted a majority of the trustees of his father's will, however, was rendered moot after he died of a heart attack aged 49, whilst in the Virgin Islands.

Life

Marriages

Dorothy Hart Hearst 
Hearst's first marriage was to Dorothy Hart Hearst. Their marriage ended after Hart divorced and sued him in 1932, citing "extreme cruelty" from Hearst.

Gretchen Wilson Hearst 
Hearst remarried to Gretchen Wilson Hearst; their marriage ended in 1938 when Wilson divorced him and won custody of their son, John Randolph Hearst Jr. (Wilson later married Woolworth Donahue (Jesse (Woolworth) Donahue's son).

Fanne Wade Hearst 
Hearst remarried for a final time to Fanne Wade Hearst, and in 1946, the couple purchased the former estate of Henry Anderson in Flower Hill, New York.

Children 
Hearst had four children, including John Jr., who served a company executive and director who represented this branch of the family among the trustees.

References 

John Randolph
American socialites
Flower Hill, New York
1909 births
1958 deaths